Audrey Kawasaki (born March 31, 1982 in Los Angeles, California) is a Los Angeles-based painter, known for her distinctive, erotically charged portrayals of young, adolescent women. Her works are oil paintings painted directly onto wood panels, and her style has been described as a fusion of Art Nouveau and Japanese manga, with primary influences like Gustav Klimt and Alphonse Mucha, saying “The merging of realistically molded faces and bodies against the contrast of flat lines and patterns is so stimulating to me.”

Kawasaki studied fine art painting for two years at the Pratt Institute in New York City, but left after two years without completing her degree. She has reported that several of her professors suggested that she should stay away from her particular style of painting nudes. She cites the emphasis in the New York art scene on conceptual art, an approach at odds with her figurative, illustrative style, as among the reasons she left. As of 2006, Kawasaki was considered a rising star in the Los Angeles art scene. In 2005, Kawasaki designed the cover art for Alice Smith's For Lovers, Dreamers & Me.

References

External links

Audrey Kawasaki: A Gallery of Artworks
"Hot Young Artists", Jane, November 2006.
"Audrey Kawasaki" interview, IdN Magazine 13(5), January 2007.
"Naughty but Nice" by Kate Atkinson, Vogue Australia, October 2007.
Audrey Kawasaki - Adri's World

1982 births
Living people
American women painters
Painters from California
Artists from Los Angeles
Pratt Institute alumni
American erotic artists
American artists of Japanese descent
21st-century American women artists